Michael Welsh may refer to:

 Michael Welsh (Labour politician) (1926–2012), British Member of Parliament for Doncaster
 Michael Welsh (Conservative politician) (born 1942), British former Member of the European Parliament
 Michael J. Welsh (biologist), American pulmonologist
 Mikey Welsh (1971–2011), American bassist

See also
Michael Welch (disambiguation)